The 1993–94 Pittsburgh Penguins season was the Penguins' 27th season in the National Hockey League (NHL).

Offseason

Regular season
The Penguins moved into the newly formed Northeast Division (competing against the teams that made up the old Adams Division) and won their third division crown in four seasons. This season marked the return to the Penguins and to the bench of head coach Eddie Johnston. Under EJ's guidance the Pens racked up a 101-point season, their second straight 100 point season and second in franchise history. The Northeast Division title earned them a second seed and a first round playoff date with the Washington Capitals. The Caps won the series in six games, which until 2018 was the only series victory that the Capitals had earned over the rival Penguins.

Of note from the season:
The Penguins were not shut out in any of their 84 regular-season games.
Injuries limited Mario Lemieux to only 22 regular season games.
Rookie Markus Naslund made his NHL debut. Other rookies debuting for the Penguins were Chris Tamer, Greg Andrusak, Ed Patterson, Pat Neaton, Rob Dopson, Justin Duberman, and Ladislav Karabin.
Each team during the 1993-1994 season played two neutral site games. The Penguins played, and won, in Sacramento vs Buffalo and in Cleveland vs. Boston on Easter Sunday.
An offseason trade landed the Penguins Marty McSorely in exchange for Shawn McEachern. On February 16, the Pens and Kings made another trade, with McSorely and McEachern again involved: the Pens 
traded McSorely and Jim Paek to LA for Tomas Sandstrom and McEachern.
Other trades: Paul Stanton to Boston for 3rd round pick 1994; Jeff Daniels to Florida for Greg Hawgood; Mike Needham to Dallas for Jim McKenzie
RW Martin Straka had his first ever 30 goal season.
Center Brian Trottier unretired for one season and acted in a player/coach role, playing 41 games for the team as officially part of their coaching staff.
Goaltender Roberto Romano made his return to the Penguins (and to the NHL) after toiling in Italy since the 1987-1988 season. Romano went 1-0-1 in his two appearances for the Penguins, his last games in the NHL.
On November 16, 1993, the Penguins defeated the Flyers, 11-5. This would be the last time the Penguins scored 11 goals in a game for 29 years.

Season standings

Schedule and results

|-  style="background:#fcf;"
| 1 || 5 || Pittsburgh Penguins || 3–4 || Philadelphia Flyers || 0–1–0 || 0
|-  style="background:#cfc;"
| 2 || 7 || Montreal Canadiens || 1–2 OT || Pittsburgh Penguins || 1–1–0 || 2
|-  style="background:#cfc;"
| 3 || 9 || New York Rangers || 2–3 || Pittsburgh Penguins || 2–1–0 || 4
|-  style="background:#fcf;"
| 4 || 10 || Pittsburgh Penguins || 4–7 || Quebec Nordiques || 2–2–0 || 4
|-  style="background:#cfc;"
| 5 || 12 || Pittsburgh Penguins || 2–1 || Florida Panthers || 3–2–0 || 6
|-  style="background:#fcf;"
| 6 || 14 || Pittsburgh Penguins || 2–3 || Tampa Bay Lightning || 3–3–0 || 6
|-  style="background:#cfc;"
| 7 || 16 || Hartford Whalers || 3–5 || Pittsburgh Penguins || 4–3–0 || 8
|-  style="background:#cfc;"
| 8 || 19 || Pittsburgh Penguins || 3–2 || New York Islanders || 5–3–0 || 10
|-  style="background:#cfc;"
| 9 || 22 || Pittsburgh Penguins || 4–2 || Buffalo Sabres || 6–3–0 || 12
|-  style="background:#ffc;"
| 10 || 23 || St. Louis Blues || 3–3 OT || Pittsburgh Penguins || 6–3–1 || 13
|-  style="background:#fcf;"
| 11 || 28 || Quebec Nordiques || 7–3 || Pittsburgh Penguins || 6–4–1 || 13
|-  style="background:#cfc;"
| 12 || 30 || Chicago Blackhawks || 3–4 || Pittsburgh Penguins || 7–4–1 || 15
|-

|-  style="background:#ffc;"
| 13 || 2 || Pittsburgh Penguins || 3–3 OT || San Jose Sharks || 7–4–2 || 16
|-  style="background:#cfc;"
| 14 || 3 || Pittsburgh Penguins || 6–2 || Buffalo Sabres || 8–4–2 || 18
|-  style="background:#fcf;"
| 15 || 6 || Pittsburgh Penguins || 3–8 || Los Angeles Kings || 8–5–2 || 18
|-  style="background:#cfc;"
| 16 || 7 || Pittsburgh Penguins || 5–4 || Mighty Ducks of Anaheim || 9–5–2 || 20
|-  style="background:#ffc;"
| 17 || 9 || Pittsburgh Penguins || 3–3 OT || St. Louis Blues || 9–5–3 || 21
|-  style="background:#fcf;"
| 18 || 11 || Pittsburgh Penguins || 1–4 || Chicago Blackhawks || 9–6–3 || 21
|-  style="background:#fcf;"
| 19 || 13 || Detroit Red Wings || 7–3 || Pittsburgh Penguins || 9–7–3 || 21
|-  style="background:#cfc;"
| 20 || 16 || Philadelphia Flyers || 5–11 || Pittsburgh Penguins || 10–7–3 || 23
|-  style="background:#cfc;"
| 21 || 18 || Washington Capitals || 2–3 || Pittsburgh Penguins || 11–7–3 || 25
|-  style="background:#ffc;"
| 22 || 20 || Pittsburgh Penguins || 2–2 OT || Montreal Canadiens || 11–7–4 || 26
|-  style="background:#cfc;"
| 23 || 24 || Boston Bruins || 3–7 || Pittsburgh Penguins || 12–7–4 || 28
|-  style="background:#ffc;"
| 24 || 26 || Pittsburgh Penguins || 4–4 OT || Washington Capitals || 12–7–5 || 29
|-  style="background:#ffc;"
| 25 || 27 || Ottawa Senators || 2–2 OT || Pittsburgh Penguins || 12–7–6 || 30
|-

|-  style="background:#ffc;"
| 26 || 2 || New Jersey Devils || 2–2 OT || Pittsburgh Penguins || 12–7–7 || 31
|-  style="background:#cfc;"
| 27 || 4 || Pittsburgh Penguins || 7–6 OT || Hartford Whalers || 13–7–7 || 33
|-  style="background:#fcf;"
| 28 || 8 || Pittsburgh Penguins || 2–3 || Dallas Stars || 13–8–7 || 33
|-  style="background:#cfc;"
| 29 || 11 || Pittsburgh Penguins || 6–3 || Tampa Bay Lightning || 14–8–7 || 35
|-  style="background:#cfc;"
| 30 || 14 || Los Angeles Kings || 2–4 || Pittsburgh Penguins || 15–8–7 || 37
|-  style="background:#cfc;"
| 31 || 16 || Buffalo Sabres || 1–2 || Pittsburgh Penguins || 16–8–7 || 39
|-  style="background:#fcf;"
| 32 || 19 || New York Islanders || 6–3 || Pittsburgh Penguins || 16–9–7 || 39
|-  style="background:#cfc;"
| 33 || 21 || Tampa Bay Lightning || 3–8 || Pittsburgh Penguins || 17–9–7 || 41
|-  style="background:#cfc;"
| 34 || 23 || Pittsburgh Penguins || 4–3 || Boston Bruins || 18–9–7 || 43
|-  style="background:#fcf;"
| 35 || 26 || Pittsburgh Penguins || 3–7 || Washington Capitals || 18–10–7 || 43
|-  style="background:#ffc;"
| 36 || 28 || Philadelphia Flyers || 4–4 OT || Pittsburgh Penguins || 18–10–8 || 44
|-  style="background:#fcf;"
| 37 || 31 || Quebec Nordiques || 5–4 || Pittsburgh Penguins || 18–11–8 || 44
|-

|-  style="background:#fcf;"
| 38 || 2 || Pittsburgh Penguins || 2–7 || Hartford Whalers || 18–12–8 || 44
|-  style="background:#cfc;"
| 39 || 3 || Pittsburgh Penguins || 4–1 || Ottawa Senators || 19–12–8 || 46
|-  style="background:#cfc;"
| 40 || 7 || Pittsburgh Penguins || 4–3 OT || Buffalo Sabres || 20–12–8 || 48
|-  style="background:#ffc;"
| 41 || 8 || Calgary Flames || 2–2 OT || Pittsburgh Penguins || 20–12–9 || 49
|-  style="background:#cfc;"
| 42 || 11 || Boston Bruins || 4–5 OT || Pittsburgh Penguins || 21–12–9 || 51
|-  style="background:#ffc;"
| 43 || 13 || Florida Panthers || 2–2 OT || Pittsburgh Penguins || 21–12–10 || 52
|-  style="background:#cfc;"
| 44 || 15 || Edmonton Oilers || 3–4 || Pittsburgh Penguins || 22–12–10 || 54
|-  style="background:#fcf;"
| 45 || 18 || Pittsburgh Penguins || 3–6 || Quebec Nordiques || 22–13–10 || 54
|-  style="background:#cfc;"
| 46 || 25 || Ottawa Senators || 2–4 || Pittsburgh Penguins || 23–13–10 || 56
|-  style="background:#cfc;"
| 47 || 27 || Quebec Nordiques || 0–3 || Pittsburgh Penguins || 24–13–10 || 58
|-  style="background:#ffc;"
| 48 || 29 || Pittsburgh Penguins || 4–4 OT || Toronto Maple Leafs || 24–13–11 || 59
|-  style="background:#fcf;"
| 49 || 31 || Pittsburgh Penguins || 3–5 || New York Rangers || 24–14–11 || 59
|-

|-  style="background:#cfc;"
| 50 || 1 || Florida Panthers || 1–2 || Pittsburgh Penguins || 25–14–11 || 61
|-  style="background:#cfc;"
| 51 || 4 || Pittsburgh Penguins || 6–3 || Detroit Red Wings || 26–14–11 || 63
|-  style="background:#fcf;"
| 52 || 5 || Pittsburgh Penguins || 3–7 || New Jersey Devils || 26–15–11 || 63
|-  style="background:#fcf;"
| 53 || 7 || Montreal Canadiens || 4–1 || Pittsburgh Penguins || 26–16–11 || 63
|-  style="background:#fcf;"
| 54 || 10 || New York Islanders || 5–3 || Pittsburgh Penguins || 26–17–11 || 63
|-  style="background:#fcf;"
| 55 || 12 || Dallas Stars || 9–3 || Pittsburgh Penguins || 26–18–11 || 63
|-  style="background:#cfc;"
| 56 || 13 || Pittsburgh Penguins || 3–0 || Philadelphia Flyers || 27–18–11 || 65
|-  style="background:#cfc;"
| 57 || 15 || Winnipeg Jets || 3–5 || Pittsburgh Penguins || 28–18–11 || 67
|-  style="background:#cfc;"
| 58 || 17 || Hartford Whalers || 4–6 || Pittsburgh Penguins || 29–18–11 || 69
|-  style="background:#fcf;"
| 59 || 19 || Pittsburgh Penguins || 1–4 || Montreal Canadiens || 29–19–11 || 69
|-  style="background:#fcf;"
| 60 || 21 || Pittsburgh Penguins || 3–4 OT || New York Rangers || 29–20–11 || 69
|-  style="background:#ffc;"
| 61 || 24 || Mighty Ducks of Anaheim || 2–2 OT || Pittsburgh Penguins || 29–20–12 || 70
|-  style="background:#cfc;"
| 62 || 26 || Buffalo Sabres || 3–4 || Pittsburgh Penguins || 30–20–12 || 72
|-  style="background:#cfc;"
| 63 || 28 || Pittsburgh Penguins || 4–3 || Florida Panthers || 31–20–12 || 74
|-

|-  style="background:#fcf;"
| 64 || 4 || Pittsburgh Penguins || 1–2 || Buffalo Sabres || 31–21–12 || 74
|-  style="background:#cfc;"
| 65 || 6 || Pittsburgh Penguins || 5–3 || Winnipeg Jets || 32–21–12 || 76
|-  style="background:#cfc;"
| 66 || 8 || Boston Bruins || 3–7 || Pittsburgh Penguins || 33–21–12 || 78
|-  style="background:#fcf;"
| 67 || 10 || Toronto Maple Leafs || 4–2 || Pittsburgh Penguins || 33–22–12 || 78
|-  style="background:#cfc;"
| 68 || 12 || New York Rangers || 2–6 || Pittsburgh Penguins || 34–22–12 || 80
|-  style="background:#cfc;"
| 69 || 13 || Pittsburgh Penguins || 3–2 || Hartford Whalers || 35–22–12 || 82
|-  style="background:#fcf;"
| 70 || 15 || Washington Capitals || 5–4 OT || Pittsburgh Penguins || 35–23–12 || 82
|-  style="background:#cfc;"
| 71 || 17 || Pittsburgh Penguins || 4–2 || Boston Bruins || 36–23–12 || 84
|-  style="background:#cfc;"
| 72 || 19 || Vancouver Canucks || 4–5 || Pittsburgh Penguins || 37–23–12 || 86
|-  style="background:#cfc;"
| 73 || 20 || Pittsburgh Penguins || 2–1 || New York Islanders || 38–23–12 || 88
|-  style="background:#ffc;"
| 74 || 22 || San Jose Sharks || 2–2 OT || Pittsburgh Penguins || 38–23–13 || 89
|-  style="background:#cfc;"
| 75 || 24 || Ottawa Senators || 1–5 || Pittsburgh Penguins || 39–23–13 || 91
|-  style="background:#fcf;"
| 76 || 26 || Pittsburgh Penguins || 3–5 || Calgary Flames || 39–24–13 || 91
|-  style="background:#fcf;"
| 77 || 27 || Pittsburgh Penguins || 3–5 || Edmonton Oilers || 39–25–13 || 91
|-  style="background:#cfc;"
| 78 || 30 || Pittsburgh Penguins || 3–1 || Vancouver Canucks || 40–25–13 || 93
|-

|-  style="background:#cfc;"
| 79 || 3 || Boston Bruins || 2–6 || Pittsburgh Penguins || 41–25–13 || 95
|-  style="background:#cfc;"
| 80 || 4 || Tampa Bay Lightning || 1–2 || Pittsburgh Penguins || 42–25–13 || 97
|-  style="background:#cfc;"
| 81 || 6 || New Jersey Devils || 1–3 || Pittsburgh Penguins || 43–25–13 || 99
|-  style="background:#fcf;"
| 82 || 8 || Pittsburgh Penguins || 2–7 || New Jersey Devils || 43–26–13 || 99
|-  style="background:#fcf;"
| 83 || 9 || Pittsburgh Penguins || 1–9 || Montreal Canadiens || 43–27–13 || 99
|-  style="background:#cfc;"
| 84 || 11 || Pittsburgh Penguins || 4–0 || Ottawa Senators || 44–27–13 || 101
|-

|- style="text-align:center;"
| Legend:       = Win       = Loss       = Tie

Playoffs

Conference Quarterfinals

Player statistics
Skaters

Goaltenders

†Denotes player spent time with another team before joining the Penguins.  Stats reflect time with the Penguins only.
‡Denotes player was traded mid-season.  Stats reflect time with the Penguins only.

Awards and records
 Mario Lemieux became the first person to score 700 assists for the Penguins. He did so in a 3–3 tie with San Jose on November 2.
 Mario Lemieux became the first person to score 1200 points for the Penguins. He did so in a 3–5 loss to Calgary on March 26.

Awards

Transactions
The Penguins were involved in the following transactions during the 1993–94 season:

Trades

Free agents

Waivers

Signings

Draft picks

The Penguins' selected eleven players at the 1993 NHL Entry Draft.

Draft notes 
 The Philadelphia Flyers' third-round pick (from the Winnipeg Jets) went to the Pittsburgh Penguins as a result of a February 19, 1992, trade that sent Mark Recchi, Brian Benning and a 1992 first-round pick to the Flyers in exchange for Kjell Samuelsson, Rick Tocchet, Ken Wregget and this pick.
 The Pittsburgh Penguins' third-round pick went to the Tampa Bay Lightning as the result of a March 22, 1993, trade that sent Peter Taglianetti to the Penguins in exchange for this pick.

Farm teams
The IHL's Cleveland Lumberjacks finished last in the Atlantic Division with a 31-36-14 record.

The Louisville Icehawks of the East Coast Hockey League finished fifth in the West Division with a 16-44-8 record, qualifying for the playoffs.  They upset the Brabham Cup champion Knoxville Cherokees in the first round before being swept by the Birmingham Bulls in the second round.

References
Penguins on Hockey Database

Pittsburgh Penguins seasons
P
P
Pitts
Pitts